Bourzanga  is a department of Bam Province in northern-central Burkina Faso. Its capital lies at Bourzanga town. According to the 2006 census the commune has a population of 48,545.

Towns and villages
 Bourzanga (7 088 inhabitants) (capital)
 Abra (884 inhabitants)
 Alamanini (704 inhabitants)
 Alga (1 328 inhabitants)
 Alga-Fulbé (237 inhabitants)
 Bani (1 853 inhabitants)
 Bassé (2 138 inhabitants)
 Bassé-Fulbé (571 inhabitants)
 Bondé (409 inhabitants)
 Bonga (438 inhabitants)
 Bolkiba (287 inhabitants)
 Boulounga (2 296 inhabitants)
 Diagadéré (297 inhabitants)
 Doundégué (371 inhabitants)
 Felenga (428 inhabitants)
 Felenga Fulbé (513 inhabitants)
 Fétorané (380 inhabitants)
 Kiéké (831 inhabitants)
 Kièka Fulbé (125 inhabitants)
 Kourao (1 500 inhabitants)
 Maléoualé (793 inhabitants)
 Mawarida (225 inhabitants)
 Nafo (1 650 inhabitants)
 Namassa (233 inhabitants)
 Namssiguia (2 776 inhabitants)
 Napalgue (1 293 inhabitants)
 Nioumbila (1 725 inhabitants)
 Ouemtenga (259 inhabitants)
 Pissélé (1 026 inhabitants)
 Sam (2 060 inhabitants)
 Sam-Fulbé (467 inhabitants)
 Sanare (680 inhabitants)
 Selnore (1 628 inhabitants)
 Selnoré-Fulbé (47 inhabitants)
 Singtenga (831 inhabitants)
 Tabaongo (641 inhabitants)
 Tebera (968 inhabitants)
 Zana (1 620 inhabitants)
 Zana Mogo (976 inhabitants)
 Zomkalga (841 inhabitants)
 Zon (1 620 inhabitants)

References

Departments of Burkina Faso